Carbon capture and storage (CCS) is a process in which a relatively pure stream of carbon dioxide (CO2) from industrial sources is separated, treated and transported to a long-term storage location. For example, the carbon dioxide stream that is to be captured can result from burning fossil fuels or biomass. Usually the CO2 is captured from large point sources, such as a chemical plant or biomass plant, and then stored in an underground geological formation. The aim is to reduce greenhouse gas emissions and thus mitigate climate change.

CO2 can be captured directly from an industrial source, such as a cement kiln, using a variety of technologies; including absorption, adsorption, chemical looping, membrane gas separation or gas hydration. , about one thousandth of global CO2 emissions are captured by CCS, and most projects are for fossil gas processing. The technology has a success rate of between 50 and 68% of captured carbon, and aspirations of a 90% or 100% capture rate have not been achieved.

Opponents point out that many CCS projects have failed to deliver on promised emissions reductions. Additionally, opponents argue that carbon capture and storage is only a justification for indefinite fossil fuel usage disguised as marginal emission reductions.

Carbon capture and utilization (CCU) and CCS are sometimes discussed collectively as carbon capture, utilization, and sequestration (CCUS). This is because CCS is a relatively expensive process yielding a product which is often too cheap. Hence, carbon capture makes economically more sense where the carbon price is high enough, such as in much of Europe, or when combined with a utilization process where the cheap CO2 can be used to produce high-value chemicals to offset the high costs of capture operations.

Storage of the CO2 is either in deep geological formations, or in the form of mineral carbonates. Pyrogenic carbon capture and storage (PyCCS) is also being researched. Geological formations are currently considered the most promising sequestration sites. The US National Energy Technology Laboratory (NETL) reported that North America has enough storage capacity for more than 900 years worth of CO2 at current production rates. A general problem is that long-term predictions about submarine or underground storage security are very difficult and uncertain, and there is still the risk that some CO2 might leak into the atmosphere. Despite this, a recent evaluation estimates the risk of substantial leakage to be fairly low.

Terminology 
The term carbon capture and storage is also known as carbon dioxide capture and storage. The definition for this term is: "A process in which a relatively pure stream of carbon dioxide (CO2) from industrial and energy-related sources is separated (captured), conditioned, compressed and transported to a storage location for long-term isolation from the atmosphere." The term and concept is related to bioenergy with carbon capture and storage (BECCS), carbon sequestration, and carbon dioxide removal (also called negative emissions).

The terms CCS and CCUS (Carbon Capture, Utilization, and Storage) are often used interchangeably. The difference between the two is the specified 'utilization' of the captured carbon and refers to its use for other applications, such as enhanced oil recovery (EOR), potentially making liquid fuel, or the manufacturing of useful consumer goods, such as plastics. Since both approaches capture emitted CO2 and effectively store it, whether that be under-ground in geological formations or long-term trapping in material products, the two terms are often treated the same.

Carbon capture and utilization is the process of capturing carbon dioxide (CO2) to be recycled for further usage.

Purpose 
Carbon capture and storage technologies basically capture carbon dioxide that is emitted from power plants, factories, fuel burning industries, and new generation livestock production facilities as they transition into restorative farming techniques to reduce carbon emissions.

Role in climate change mitigation 

CCS is employed to contribute to climate change mitigation. Large-scale CCS plays a crucial role in reaching climate change stabilization. CCS' primary role is to delay the shift from fossil fuels and thereby reduce transition costs. The implementation of default technology assumptions would cost 29-297% more over the century than efforts without CCS for a 430-480 ppm CO2/yr scenario. The Paris agreement upholds a goal to reach no more than a 2.0 °C increase above pre-industrial temperatures. If the 2.0 °C goal is to be reached in time, CCS must be utilized to achieve net zero emissions by 2060–2070. After 2060–2070, negative emissions will need to be achieved to remain below the 2.0 °C target. The variations in methods depend heavily on the climate change model being used and the anticipated energy consumption patterns. It is widely agreed upon, however, that CCS would need to be utilized if there is to be any negative climate change mitigation.

A change below 1 °C with respect to the pre-industrial era is now inconceivable because by 2017 there was already an increase of 1 °C. Because of the immediate inability to control the temperature at the 1 °C target, the next realistic target is 1.5 °C. Scenarios where the degree change is maintained below 1.5 °C are challenging but not impossible.

For a below 2.0 °C target, Shared socioeconomic pathways (SSPs) had been developed adding a socio-economic dimension to the integrative work started by RCPs models. All SSPs scenarios show a shift away from unabated fossil fuels, that is processes without CCS.

To achieve a 1.5 °C target before 2100, the following assumptions have to be considered; emissions have to peak by 2020 and decline after that, it will be necessary to reduce net CO2 emissions to zero and negative emissions have to be a reality by the second half of the 21st century. For these assumptions to take place, CCS has to be implemented in factories that accompany the use of fossil fuels. Because emissions reduction has to be implemented more rigorously for a 1.5 °C target, methods such as BEECS, and natural climate solutions such as afforestation can be used to aim for the reduction of global emissions. BECCS is necessary to achieve a 1.5 °C. The models estimate that with the help of BECCS, between 150 and 12000 GtCO2 still have to be removed from the atmosphere.

Technology components

Capture 
Capturing CO2 is most cost-effective at point sources, such as large carbon-based energy facilities, industries with major CO2 emissions (e.g. cement production, steelmaking), natural gas processing, synthetic fuel plants and fossil fuel-based hydrogen production plants. Extracting CO2 from air is possible, although the lower concentration of CO2 in air compared to combustion sources complicates the engineering and makes the process therefore more expensive.

Impurities in CO2 streams, like sulfurs and water, can have a significant effect on their phase behavior and could pose a significant threat of increased pipeline and well corrosion. In instances where CO2 impurities exist, especially with air capture, a scrubbing separation process is needed to initially clean the flue gas.

A wide variety of separation techniques are being pursued, including gas phase separation, absorption into a liquid, and adsorption on a solid, as well as hybrid processes, such as adsorption/membrane systems. There are three ways that this capturing can be carried out: post-combustion capture, pre-combustion capture, and oxy-combustion:

In post combustion capture, the CO2 is removed after combustion of the fossil fuel—this is the scheme that would apply to fossil-fuel power plants. CO2 is captured from flue gases at power stations or other point sources. The technology is well understood and is currently used in other industrial applications, although at smaller scale than required in a commercial scale station. Post combustion capture is most popular in research because fossil fuel power plants can be retrofitted to include CCS technology in this configuration.
The technology for pre-combustion is widely applied in fertilizer, chemical, gaseous fuel (H2, CH4), and power production. In these cases, the fossil fuel is partially oxidized, for instance in a gasifier. The CO from the resulting syngas (CO and H2) reacts with added steam (H2O) and is shifted into CO2 and H2. The resulting CO2 can be captured from a relatively pure exhaust stream. The H2 can be used as fuel; the CO2 is removed before combustion. Several advantages and disadvantages apply versus post combustion capture. The CO2 is removed after combustion, but before the flue gas expands to atmospheric pressure. The capture before expansion, i.e. from pressurized gas, is standard in almost all industrial CO2 capture processes, at the same scale as required for power plants.
In oxy-fuel combustion the fuel is burned in pure oxygen instead of air. To limit the resulting flame temperatures to levels common during conventional combustion, cooled flue gas is recirculated and injected into the combustion chamber. The flue gas consists of mainly CO2 and water vapour, the latter of which is condensed through cooling. The result is an almost pure CO2 stream. Power plant processes based on oxyfuel combustion are sometimes referred to as "zero emission" cycles, because the CO2 stored is not a fraction removed from the flue gas stream (as in the cases of pre- and post-combustion capture) but the flue gas stream itself. A certain fraction of the CO2 inevitably end up in the condensed water. To warrant the label "zero emission" the water would thus have to be treated or disposed of appropriately.

Separation technologies 

The major technologies proposed for carbon capture are:
 Membrane
 Oxyfuel combustion
 Absorption
 Multiphase absorption
 Adsorption
 Chemical looping combustion
 Calcium looping
 Cryogenic

Absorption, or carbon scrubbing with amines is the dominant capture technology. It is the only carbon capture technology so far that has been used industrially. Monoethanolamine (MEA) solutions, the leading amine for capturing CO2 , have a heat capacity between 3–4 J/g K since they are mostly water. Higher heat capacities add to the energy penalty in the solvent regeneration step.

About two thirds of CCS cost is attributed to capture, making it the limit to CCS deployment. Optimizing capture would significantly increase CCS feasibility since the transport and storage steps of CCS are rather mature.

An alternate method is chemical looping combustion (CLC). Looping uses a metal oxide as a solid oxygen carrier. Metal oxide particles react with a solid, liquid or gaseous fuel in a fluidized bed combustor, producing solid metal particles and a mixture of CO2 and water vapor. The water vapor is condensed, leaving pure CO2 , which can then be sequestered. The solid metal particles are circulated to another fluidized bed where they react with air, producing heat and regenerating metal oxide particles for return to the combustor. A variant of chemical looping is calcium looping, which uses the alternating carbonation and then calcination of a calcium oxide based carrier.

A 2019 study found CCS plants to be less effective than renewable electricity. The electrical energy returned on energy invested (EROEI) ratios of both production methods were estimated, accounting for their operational and infrastructural energy costs. Renewable electricity production included solar and wind with sufficient energy storage, plus dispatchable electricity production. Thus, rapid expansion of scalable renewable electricity and storage would be preferable over fossil-fuel with CCS. The study did not consider whether both options could be pursued in parallel.

In 2021 High Hopes proposed using high-altitude balloons to capture CO2 cryogenically, using hydrogen to lower the already low-temperature atmosphere sufficiently to produce dry ice that is returned to earth for sequestration.

In sorption enhanced water gas shift (SEWGS) technology a pre-combustion carbon capture process, based on solid adsorption, is combined with the water gas shift reaction (WGS) in order to produce a high pressure hydrogen stream. The CO2 stream produced can be stored or used for other industrial processes.

Compression 
After the  has been captured, it is usually compressed into a supercritical fluid. The  is compressed so that it can be more easily transported. Compression is done at the capture site. This process requires its own energy source. Like the capture stage, compression is achieved by increasing the parasitic load.

Transport 
Large volumes of highly pressurized  are transported via pipelines.

For example, approximately 5,800 km of CO2 pipelines operated in the US in 2008, and a 160 km pipeline in Norway, used to transport CO2 to oil production sites where it is injected into older fields to extract oil. This injection is called enhanced oil recovery. Pilot programs are in development to test long-term storage in non-oil producing geologic formations. In the United Kingdom, the Parliamentary Office of Science and Technology envisages pipelines as the main UK transport.

In 2021, two companies, namely Navigator  Ventures and Summit Carbon Solutions were planning pipelines through the Midwestern US from North Dakota to Illinois to connect ethanol companies to sites where liquefied  is injected into porous rock.

Leakage during transport 
Transmission pipelines may leak or rupture. Pipelines can be fitted with remotely controlled valves that can limit the release quantity to one pipe section. For example, a severed 19" pipeline section 8 km long could release its 1,300 tonnes in about 3–4 min.

Sequestration (storage) 

Various approaches have been conceived for permanent storage. These include gaseous storage in deep geological formations (including saline formations and exhausted gas fields), and solid storage by reaction of CO2 with metal oxides to produce stable carbonates.

Geo-sequestration, involves injecting CO2 , generally in supercritical form, into underground geological formations. Oil fields, gas fields, saline formations, unmineable coal seams, and saline-filled basalt formations have been suggested as alternatives. At the molecular level, carbon dioxide is shown to affect the mechanical properties of the formation where it has been injected. Physical (e.g., highly impermeable caprock) and geochemical trapping mechanisms prevent the CO2 from escaping to the surface.

Unmineable coal seams can be used because CO2 molecules attach to the coal surface. Technical feasibility depends on the coal bed's permeability. In the process of absorption the coal releases previously absorbed methane, and the methane can be recovered (enhanced coal bed methane recovery). Methane revenues can offset a portion of the cost, although burning the resultant methane, however, produces another stream of CO2 to be sequestered.

Saline formations contain mineralized brines and have yet to produce benefit to humans. Saline aquifers have occasionally been used for storage of chemical waste in a few cases. The main advantage of saline aquifers is their large potential storage volume and their ubiquity. The major disadvantage of saline aquifers is that relatively little is known about them. To keep the cost of storage acceptable, geophysical exploration may be limited, resulting in larger uncertainty about the aquifer structure. Unlike storage in oil fields or coal beds, no side product offsets the storage cost. Trapping mechanisms such as structural trapping, residual trapping, solubility trapping and mineral trapping may immobilize the CO2 underground and reduce leakage risks.

Enhanced oil recovery 
CO2 is occasionally injected into an oil field as an enhanced oil recovery technique, but because CO2 is released when the oil is burned, it is not carbon neutral.

CO2 has been injected into geological formations for several decades for enhanced oil recovery and after separation from natural gas, but this has been criticised for producing more emissions when the gas or oil is burned.

Leakage risks during storage

Long-term retention 
IPCC estimates that leakage risks at properly managed sites are comparable to those associated with current hydrocarbon activity. It recommends that limits be set to the amount of leakage that can take place. However, this finding is contested given the lack of experience. CO2 could be trapped for millions of years, and although some leakage may occur, appropriate storage sites are likely to retain over 99% for over 1000 years.

Mineral storage is not regarded as presenting any leakage risks.

Norway's Sleipner gas field is the oldest industrial scale retention project. An environmental assessment conducted after ten years of operation concluded that geosequestration was the most definite form of permanent geological storage method:
Available geological information shows absence of major tectonic events after the deposition of the Utsira formation [saline reservoir]. This implies that the geological environment is tectonically stable and a site suitable for CO2 storage. The solubility trapping [is] the most permanent and secure form of geological storage.

In March 2009, StatoilHydro issued a study documenting the slow spread of CO2 in the formation after more than 10 years operation.

Gas leakage into the atmosphere may be detected via atmospheric gas monitoring, and can be quantified directly via eddy covariance flux measurements.

Sudden leakage hazards 
At the storage site, the injection pipe can be fitted with non-return valves to prevent an uncontrolled release from the reservoir in case of upstream pipeline damage.

Large-scale CO2 releases present asphyxiation risks. For example, in the 1953 Menzengraben mining accident, several thousand tonnes were released and asphyxiated a person 300 meters away. Malfunction of a CO2 industrial fire suppression system in a large warehouse released 50 t CO2 after which 14 people collapsed on the nearby public road.

Cost 
Cost is a significant factor affecting CCS. The cost of CCS, plus any subsidies, must be less than the expected cost of emitting CO2 for a project to be considered economically favorable.

CCS technology is expected to use between 10 and 40 percent of the energy produced by a power station. Energy for CCS is called an energy penalty. It has been estimated that about 60% of the penalty originates from the capture process, 30% comes from compression of CO2 , while the remaining 10% comes from pumps and fans. CCS would increase the fuel requirement of a plant with CCS by about 15% (gas plant). The cost of this extra fuel, as well as storage and other system costs, are estimated to increase the costs of energy from a power plant with CCS by 30–60%.

Constructing CCS units is capital intensive. The additional costs of a large-scale CCS demonstration project are estimated to be €0.5–1.1 billion per project over the project lifetime. Other applications are possible. CCS trials for coal-fired plants in the early 21st century were  economically unviable in most countries, including China, in part because revenue from enhanced oil recovery collapsed with the 2020 oil price collapse. A carbon price of at least 100 euros per tonne CO2 is estimated to be needed to make industrial CCS viable, together with carbon tariffs. But, as of mid-2022, the EU Allowance had never reached that price and the Carbon Border Adjustment Mechanism had not yet been implemented. However a company making small modules claims it can get well below that price by mass production by 2022.

According to UK government estimates made in the late 2010s, carbon capture (without storage) is estimated to add 7 GBP per MWh by 2025 to the cost of electricity from a gas-fired power plant: however most CO2 will need to be stored so in total the increase in cost for gas or biomass generated electricity is around 50%.

Business models 
Possible business models for industrial carbon capture include:

 Contract for Difference CfDC CO2 certificate strike price
 Cost Plus open book
 Regulated Asset Base (RAB)
 Tradeable tax credits for CCS
 Tradeable CCS certificates + obligation
 Creation of low carbon market

Governments have provided various types of funding for CCS demonstration projects, including tax credits, allocations and grants.

Clean Development Mechanism 
One alternative could be through the Clean Development Mechanism of the Kyoto Protocol. At COP16 in 2010, The Subsidiary Body for Scientific and Technological Advice, at its thirty-third session, issued a draft document recommending the inclusion of CCS in geological formations in Clean Development Mechanism project activities. At COP17 in Durban, a final agreement was reached enabling CCS projects to receive support through the Clean Development Mechanism.

Environmental effects

Alkaline solvents 

CO2 can be captured with alkaline solvents at low temperatures in the absorber and released CO2 at higher temperatures in a desorber. Chilled ammonia CCS plants emit ammonia. "Functionalized Ammonia" emits less ammonia, but amines may form secondary amines that emit volatile nitrosamines by a side reaction with nitrogen dioxide, which is present in any flue gas. Alternative amines with little to no vapor pressure can avoid these emissions. Nevertheless, practically 100% of remaining sulfur dioxide from the plant is washed out of the flue gas, along with dust/ash.

Natural gas processing and enhanced oil recovery 
The Institute for Energy Economics & Financial Analysis has criticised companies for not reporting greenhouse gas emissions from the use of their  products.  from natural-gas processing is often used for EOR. It has been suggested that enhanced oil recovery only be allowed to use anthropogenic  and should only receive financial incentives such as tax credits when carbon negative, which is generally only in the early years of a project.

Gas and coal-fired power plants 
Although the global total  emitted by fossil fuel power plants is very large, coal plant flue gas typically only contains 10–14% , and gas power plants only 4–5% . Cost per tonne  increases as the capacity factor decreases (the plant is used less - for example only for times of highest demand or in emergencies).

The extra energy requirements deriving from CCS for natural gas combined cycle (NGCC) plants range from 11 to 22%. Fuel use and environmental problems (e.g., methane emissions) arising from gas extraction increase accordingly. Plants equipped with selective catalytic reduction systems for nitrogen oxides produced during combustion require proportionally greater amounts of ammonia.

A 2020 study concluded that half as much CCS might be installed in coal-fired plants as in gas-fired: these would be mainly in China and India. However a 2022 study concluded that it would be too expensive for coal power in China.

For super-critical pulverized coal (PC) plants, CCS' energy requirements range from 24 to 40%, while for coal-based gasification combined cycle (IGCC) systems it is 14–25%. Fuel use and environmental problems arising from coal extraction increase accordingly. Plants equipped with flue-gas desulfurization (FGD) systems for sulfur dioxide control require proportionally greater amounts of limestone, and systems equipped with selective catalytic reduction systems for nitrogen oxides produced during combustion require proportionally greater amounts of ammonia.  Boundary Dam is the only coal-fired power station which uses post-combustion CCS.

Monitoring 

Monitoring allows leak detection with enough warning to minimize the amount lost, and to quantify the leak size. Monitoring can be done at both the surface and subsurface levels.

Subsurface 
Subsurface monitoring can directly and/or indirectly track the reservoir's status. One direct method involves drilling deep enough to collect a sample. This drilling can be expensive due to the rock's physical properties. It also provides data only at a specific location.

One indirect method sends sound or electromagnetic waves into the reservoir which reflects back for interpretation. This approach provides data over a much larger region; although with less precision.

Both direct and indirect monitoring can be done intermittently or continuously.

Seismic 
Seismic monitoring is a type of indirect monitoring. It is done by creating seismic waves either at the surface using a seismic vibrator, or inside a well using a spinning eccentric mass. These waves propagate through geological layers and reflect back, creating patterns that are recorded by seismic sensors placed on the surface or in boreholes. It can identify migration pathways of the CO2 plume.

Examples of seismic monitoring of geological sequestration are the Sleipner sequestration project, the Frio CO2 injection test and the CO2CRC Otway Project. Seismic monitoring can confirm the presence of CO2 in a given region and map its lateral distribution, but is not sensitive to the concentration.

Tracer 
Organic chemical tracers, using no radioactive or Cadmium components, can be used during the injection phase in a CCS project where CO2 is injected into an existing oil or gas field, either for EOR, pressure support or storage. Tracers and methodologies are compatible with CO2 – and at the same time unique and distinguishable from the CO2 itself or other molecules present in the sub-surface. Using laboratory methodology with an extreme detectability for tracer, regular samples at the producing wells will detect if injected CO2 has migrated from the injection point to the producing well. Therefore, a small tracer amount is sufficient to monitor large scale subsurface flow patterns. For this reason, tracer methodology is well-suited to monitor the state and possible movements of CO2 in CCS projects. Tracers can therefore be an aid in CCS projects by acting as an assurance that CO2 is contained in the desired location sub-surface. In the past, this technology has been used to monitor and study movements in CCS projects in Algeria, the Netherlands and Norway (Snøhvit).

Surface 

Eddy covariance is a surface monitoring technique that measures the flux of CO2 from the ground's surface. It involves measuring CO2 concentrations as well as vertical wind velocities using an anemometer. This provides a measure of the vertical CO2 flux. Eddy covariance towers could potentially detect leaks, after accounting for the natural carbon cycle, such as photosynthesis and plant respiration. An example of eddy covariance techniques is the Shallow Release test. Another similar approach is to use accumulation chambers for spot monitoring. These chambers are sealed to the ground with an inlet and outlet flow stream connected to a gas analyzer. They also measure vertical flux. Monitoring a large site would require a network of  chambers.

InSAR 
InSAR monitoring involves a satellite sending signals down to the Earth's surface where it is reflected back to the satellite's receiver. The satellite is thereby able to measure the distance to that point. CO2 injection into deep sublayers of geological sites creates high pressures. These layers affect layers above and below them, change the surface landscape. In areas of stored CO2 , the ground's surface often rises due to the high pressures. These changes correspond to a measurable change in the distance from the satellite.

Society and culture

Social acceptance 
Multiple studies indicate that risk and benefit perception are the most essential components of social acceptance.

Risk perception is mostly related to the concerns on its safety issues in terms of hazards from its operations and the possibility of CO2 leakage which may endanger communities, commodities, and the environment in the vicinity of the infrastructure. Other perceived risks relate to tourism and property values.

People who are already affected by climate change, such as drought, tend to be more supportive of CCS. Locally, communities are sensitive to economic factors, including job creation, tourism or related investment.

Experience is another relevant feature. Several field studies concluded that people already involved or used to industry are likely to accept the technology. In the same way, communities who have been negatively affected by any industrial activity are also less supportive of CCS.

Few members of the public know about CCS. This can allow misconceptions that lead to less approval. No strong evidence links knowledge of CCS and public acceptance. However, one study  found that communicating information about monitoring tends to have a negative impact on attitudes. Conversely, approval seems to be reinforced when CCS is compared to natural phenomena.

Due to the lack of knowledge, people rely on organizations that they trust. In general, non-governmental organizations and researchers experience higher trust than stakeholders and governments. Opinions amongst NGOs are mixed. Moreover, the link between trust and acceptance is at best indirect. Instead, trust has an influence on the perception of risks and benefits.

CCS is embraced by the shallow ecology worldview, which promotes the search for solutions to the effects of climate change in lieu of/in addition to addressing the causes. This involves the use of advancing technology and CCS acceptance is common among techno-optimists. CCS is an "end-of-pipe" solution that reduces atmospheric CO2, instead of minimizing the use of fossil fuel.

On 21 January 2021, Elon Musk announced he was donating $100m for a prize for best carbon capture technology.

Political debate 
CCS has been discussed by political actors at least since the start of the UNFCCC negotiations in the beginning of the 1990s, and remains a very divisive issue.

Some environmental groups raised concerns over leakage given the long storage time required, comparing CCS to storing radioactive waste from nuclear power stations.

Other controversies arose from the use of CCS by policy makers as a tool to fight climate change. In the IPCC's Sixth Assessment Report in 2022, most pathways to keep the increase of global temperature below 2 °C include the use of negative emission technologies (NETs).

Some environmental activists and politicians have criticized CCS as a false solution to the climate crisis. They cite the role of the fossil fuel industry in origins of the technology and in lobbying for CCS focused legislation and argue that it would allow the industry to "greenwash" itself by funding and engaging in things such as tree planting campaigns without significantly cutting their carbon emissions.

Carbon emission status-quo 
Opponents claimed that CCS could legitimize the continued use of fossil fuels, as well obviate commitments on emission reduction.

Some examples such as in Norway shows that CCS and other carbon removal technologies gained traction because it allowed the country to pursue its interests regarding the petroleum industry. Norway was a pioneer in emission mitigation, and established a CO2 tax in 1991.

Environmental NGOs 
Environmental NGOs are not in widespread agreement about CCS as a potential climate mitigation tool. The main disagreement amid NGOs is whether CCS will reduce CO2 emissions or just perpetuate the use of fossil fuels.

For instance, Greenpeace is strongly against CCS. According to the organization, the use of the technology will keep the world dependent on fossil fuels.

On the other hand, BECCS is used in some IPCC scenarios to help meet mitigation targets. Adopting the IPCC argument that CO2 emissions need to be reduced by 2050 to avoid dramatic consequences, the Bellona Foundation justified CCS as a mitigation action. They claimed fossil fuels are unavoidable for the near term and consequently, CCS is the quickest way to reduce CO2 emissions.

Example projects 

According to the Global CCS Institute, in 2020 there was about 40 million tons CO2 per year capacity of CCS in operation and 50 million tons per year in development. In contrast, the world emits about 38 billion tonnes of CO2 every year, so CCS captured about one thousandth of the 2020 CO2 emissions. Iron and steel is expected to dominate industrial CCS in Europe, although there are alternative ways of decarbonizing steel.

One of the most well-known failures is the FutureGen program, partnerships between the US federal government and coal energy production companies which were intended to demonstrate ″clean coal″, but never succeeded in producing any carbon-free electricity from coal.

Related concepts

Carbon capture and utilization (CCU)

Bioenergy with carbon capture and storage (BCCS)

Direct air carbon capture and sequestration (DACCS)

See also 

 Timeline of carbon capture and storage
 Carbon sink
 Carbon storage in the North Sea
 Climate engineering
 Life-cycle greenhouse gas emissions of energy sources
 Low-carbon economy
 Methane pyrolysis
 Solid sorbents for carbon capture

References

Further reading

External links 

DOE Fossil Energy Department of Energy programs in CO2 capture and storage
US Department of Energy
US Gulf coast
Zero Emissions Platform - technical adviser to the EU Commission on the deployment of CCS and CCU
National Assessment of Geologic CO2 Storage Resources: Results United States Geological Survey
  Carbon Capture and Sequestration Technologies Program at MIT

Carbon capture and storage
Bright green environmentalism
Emissions reduction
Gas technologies
Climate change and the environment
Climate change mitigation